David Hutcheon is a former municipal politician in Toronto, Ontario.

Hutcheon has an honours Bachelor of Arts Degree in History from Rutgers University and a Master's degree in public administration from the University of Western Ontario. He was elected to Toronto City Council in 1994, winning the election in Ward 1 with 3,963 votes beating his closest rival by 781 votes. While on council he served as deputy mayor and budget chief.

In 1997 he ran in the first election after amalgamation in the newly created Ward 19 but finished in fourth place behind front runners David Miller and Chris Korwin-Kuczynski.

In a 2006 by-election in the Ontario provincial riding of Parkdale—High Park he ran as a candidate for the Progressive Conservative Party of Ontario. This by-election was necessitated by the resignation of former Ontario Minister of Education Gerard Kennedy, who stepped down from both his cabinet post and his seat in the Legislative Assembly of Ontario to seek the Liberal Party of Canada leadership. Hutcheon placed third behind New Democrat Cheri DiNovo and Liberal Sylvia Watson. On June 7, 2007, Hutcheon was acclaimed as the Progressive Conservative candidate for the 2007 Ontario election. Hutcheon again placed third.

References

 
 

Progressive Conservative Party of Ontario candidates in Ontario provincial elections
Living people
Toronto city councillors
Year of birth missing (living people)
University of Western Ontario alumni
Rutgers University alumni